Left Lane Cruiser is an American blues rock band from Fort Wayne, Indiana. The band comprises Fredrick "Joe" Evans IV on slide guitar and vocals with Pete Dio on drums and back up vocals.

The band said that their main influence comes from the North Mississippi Hill country blues musicians, most of whom were or are currently signed to Fat Possum Records.

History 

In July 2007, Left Lane Cruiser was signed to Alive Records.  Their first nationally released album, Bring Yo' Ass to the Table, was released on January 8, 2008.

In September 2008, Left Lane Cruiser embarked on their first European Tour. The first few shows were cancelled due to issues with passports when arriving in the UK, forcing the two members to return to the United States for several days. Problems with passports were then resolved and Left Lane Cruiser resumed the tour.

Their third album, All You Can Eat, was released on Alive Records, September 15, 2009. The song "Waynedale" from the All You Can Eat album was used on episode 8 of season 3 of the television series Breaking Bad.

The band released its fourth album on March 1, 2011, on Alive Records, some of which was recorded with John Wesley Myers, the keyboard player for the Black Diamond Heavies, also signed to Alive Records.

Discography

Studio albums

Members 
 Joe Evans IV (guitar, vocals, 2004–present)
 Pete Dio (Drums, 2014–present)

References

Punk blues musical groups
American blues musical groups
Alive Naturalsound Records artists
Punk rock groups from Indiana